JOJ Plus is a Slovak television channel owned by J&T Media Enterprises. It is the sister channel TV JOJ. The channel was launched on 5 October 2008 at 19:55 (7:55 PM). The channel broadcasts content that was shown on TV JOJ.

US TV series broadcast on Joj Plus

British TV series broadcast on Joj Plus

References

External links

Mass media in Slovakia
Television channels in Slovakia
Television channels and stations established in 2008
Slovak-language television stations
2008 establishments in Slovakia